Events in the year 2019 in Kyrgyzstan.

Incumbents
 President – Sooronbay Jeenbekov 
 Prime Minister – Mukhammedkalyi Abylgaziev

Events

Deaths
21 December – Bolotbek Shamshiyev, film director (b. 1941).

References

 
2010s in Kyrgyzstan
Years of the 21st century in Kyrgyzstan
Kyrgyzstan
Kyrgyzstan